Canfrancesco della Scala was the son of Antonio I della Scala. In 1387, when his father was defeated by the Visconti of Milan and fled to Ravenna, Canfrancesco remained behind and prepared to resist. However, his efforts failed, and he soon joined his father in exile in Ravenna. He tried to retake Verona in 1390.  The last recorded mention of him alive was in 1392. 

Canfrancesco
14th-century Italian nobility